Fougerolles is a former commune in the Haute-Saône department in the region of Bourgogne-Franche-Comté in eastern France. On 1 January 2019, it was merged into the new commune Fougerolles-Saint-Valbert. It is known for its kirsch and griottines.

Geography 
Fougerolles is a fairly large town of 5112 hectares, making it the largest municipality of Haute-Saône after Champlitte. It borders the Lorraine region.

The city is bisected by the river Combeauté, which descends from the neighbouring commune of Le Val-d'Ajol.

See also
Communes of the Haute-Saône department

References

Former communes of Haute-Saône
Populated places disestablished in 2019